Yves Nicolin (born March 5, 1963 in Le Coteau, Loire) is the Mayor of Roanne.  He was a member of the National Assembly of France, representing the Loire's 5th constituency from 1993 to 2017 as a member of UDF, UMP and then the Republicans.

References

1963 births
Living people
People from Le Coteau
Republican Party (France) politicians
Liberal Democracy (France) politicians
Union for French Democracy politicians
Union for a Popular Movement politicians
The Social Right
Modern and Humanist France
Deputies of the 12th National Assembly of the French Fifth Republic
Deputies of the 13th National Assembly of the French Fifth Republic
Deputies of the 14th National Assembly of the French Fifth Republic